Haseebullah Khan (born 20 March 2003) is a Pakistani cricketer who plays for Balochistan in domestic cricket and for Peshawar Zalmi in the Pakistan Super League.

Early life
Born in Pishin, a city around 50 kilometers away from Balochistan’s provincial capital Quetta, Haseebullah belongs to a cricketing family, as his father Azizullah and his uncle Hameedullah were both first-class cricketers.

Domestic career
In December 2021, Khan was called up to the Pakistan Under-19 cricket team for the 2022 Under-19 World Cup. He was later named in the Under-19 World Cup team of the tournament.

In March 2022, he made his List A debut for Balochistan in the 2021–22 Pakistan Cup against Northern. In the semi-finals of the tournament, Khan scored a century against Sindh. Balochistan won the tournament, with Khan being the leading run-scorer in the competition.

In September 2022, he made his first-class debut for Balochistan in the 2022–23 Quaid-e-Azam Trophy against Khyber Pakhtunkhwa.

In March 2023, he made his PSL debut for Peshawar Zalmi and scored a half-century.

International career
In December 2022, alongside batsman Saim Ayub and fast bowler Ihsanullah, Haseebullah was one of the three youngsters selected to be included in the national squad for the second Test match of the New Zealand series in Karachi, so they could get some international exposure and see the dynamics of the dressing room.

References

External links
 

2004 births
Living people
Balochistan cricketers
Pakistani cricketers